Turbonilla substriata is a species of sea snail, a marine gastropod mollusk in the family Pyramidellidae, the pyrams and their allies.

Distribution
This species occurs in the following locations:
 Caribbean Sea
 Gulf of Mexico
 Jamaica

References

External links
 To Encyclopedia of Life
 To World Register of Marine Species

substriata
Gastropods described in 1850